The 2012–13 Granada CF season was the 79th season in club history and their 19th season in La Liga, the top division of Spanish football. It covered a period from 1 July 2012 to 30 June 2013.

Matches

Legend

La Liga

Copa del Rey

Squad

Squad, matches played and goals scored

Minutes played

Starting 11

Bookings

Sources

Granada CF
Granada CF seasons